The 1965–66 Liga Leumit season saw Hapoel Tel Aviv crowned champions and qualify for the first Asian Club Championships. Moshe Romano (Shimshon Tel Aviv) and Mordechai Spiegler (Maccabi Netanya) were the joint top scorers with 17 goals each.

Maccabi Petah Tikva and Beitar Tel Aviv were relegated to Liga Alef.

Rule changes
Prior to the season the IFA decided to allow substitutions of one player and one goalkeeper during matches.

Final table

Results

References

Israel - List of final tables RSSSF

Liga Leumit seasons
Israel
1965–66 in Israeli football leagues